Morgan Parker may refer to:

 Morgan Parker (businessman) (born 1974), Australian real estate businessman
 Morgan Parker (writer) (born 1987), American poet, novelist, and editor
 Morgan Parker, inventor of the two-piece scalpel